Dinanath Mishra (or Dina Nath Mishra; 1937–2013) was an Indian journalist and writer belonging to the Hindu nationalist movement.  He authored a seminal work RSS: Myth and Reality on the Rashtriya Swayamsevak Sangh (RSS) from a nationalist point of view. He was elected to the Upper House of the Indian Parliament (Rajya Sabha) and served a five-year term.

Life and career 
Mishra was born in 1937 in Gaya, Bihar. His father was Indranath Mishra. He had to struggle during his early life, working as a child labourer, but would eventually complete his education and earn a Master of Arts degree.  He also became a volunteer (swayamsevak) of the Rashtriya Swayamsevak Sangh (RSS).

He served as the editor of the RSS in-house newspaper Panchjanya, from 1971 to 1974.  Later, he moved to Navbharat Times, heading its bureau in Delhi and, subsequently, its Patna edition.

Having joined the Bharatiya Janata Party, he was elected as a member of the Rajya Sabha from 1998 to 2004, during the Premiership of Atal Bihari Vajpayee.

Jointly with Balbir Punj, he founded the India First Foundation, which published the magazine Eternal India (as well as its Hindi-language version Chirantan Bharat). It also acquired an edited collection titled Sonia: The Unknown (Sonia ka sach in Hindi), which includes biographical details of Sonia Gandhi and raises questions based on her foreign origin.

Mishra died on 12 November 2013. He is survived by his wife, son and three daughters.

Senior BJP leader Balbir Punj called him a true swayamsevak dedicated to the cause of Hindutva. Rakesh Sinha of the India Policy Foundation called him a cultural nationalist that served and "survived in a secularist atmosphere."

Publications 
English
 RSS: Myth and Reality (Vikas, 1980), .
Hindi
 Hara-hara vyangye (Prabhata Prakasana, 1999), .
 Pāpī vota ke lie (in Hindi, Pratibha Pratishthana, 2002), 
 Chaploosi Rekha (Prabhat Prakashan), .

Mishra's RSS: Myth and Reality is an early work on RSS and puts forward the RSS point of view.  It is often cited in academic sources for this reason.  According to Mishra, RSS believes that modernity destroys cultural identity and suffocates dharma and divides the Hindu people.  "Signs of disintegration appear in the family, village and communal life" in the words of Dattopant Thengadi.  Mishra says, "the ersatz, sloganistic secularism has done great harm to the nation."

References

External links 
 Books published by India First Foundation at openlibrary.org

1937 births
2013 deaths
People from Gaya, India
Indian male journalists
Rashtriya Swayamsevak Sangh members
Bharatiya Janata Party politicians from Bihar
Rajya Sabha members from Uttar Pradesh
Writers about Hindu nationalism